Eilema pseudosimplex is a moth of the subfamily Arctiinae. It was described by Hervé de Toulgoët in 1977. It is found in Kenya and Rwanda.

References

 

pseudosimplex
Moths described in 1977